"Thug Mentality" is a single by Krayzie Bone. Flesh-N-Bone, Layzie Bone & Wish Bone made an appearance in the video. The song was produced by Michael Seifert.

Track listing
"Thug Mentality" (radio edit)
"Thug Mentality" (album version)
"Thug Mentality" (instrumental)
"Thug Mentality" (a capella)

Charts

1999 singles
1998 songs
Krayzie Bone songs
Ruthless Records singles
Songs written by Krayzie Bone
Gangsta rap songs